Muzon National High School (abbreviated as MuzonNHS or MuNHS) is a public school in Taytay, Rizal, Philippines. It is situated in Sapphire Street, Ciudad Grande, Barangay Muzon, with a second building in Narra Street, San Miguel Subdivision.

It was established in 2009 and formerly known as "Noel Ireneo E. Reyes Memorial National High School". It is a government funded high school that offers junior high school education.

Muzon National High School was also known as "Taytay National High School - Muzon Annex".

School administration 

School Heads

References

High schools in Rizal
Education in Taytay, Rizal